Kalinovo is a small village in Poltár District, in the Banská Bystrica Region of Slovakia.

In historical records the village was first mentioned in 1279.

See also
 List of municipalities and towns in Slovakia

References

Genealogical resources
The records for genealogical research are available at the state archive "Statny Archiv in Banska Bystrica, Slovakia"
The Lutheran Church Records are available online via FamilySearch.org. 

 Roman Catholic church records (births/marriages/deaths): 1776-1905 (parish B)
 Lutheran church records (births/marriages/deaths): 1734-1897 (parish A)

External links 
 
 
 Official website of Kalinovo
Surnames of living people in Kalinovo

Villages and municipalities in Poltár District